Phyllomedusa tarsius, the brownbelly leaf frog or tarsier leaf frog, is a species of frog in the subfamily Phyllomedusinae. It is found in Brazil, Colombia, Ecuador, Peru, and Venezuela, and possibly Bolivia and Guyana. Its natural habitats are subtropical or tropical moist lowland forests, subtropical or tropical swamps, intermittent freshwater marshes, and heavily degraded former forest. It is threatened by habitat loss.

References

tarsius
Amphibians of Brazil
Amphibians of Colombia
Amphibians of Ecuador
Amphibians of Peru
Amphibians of Venezuela
Amphibians described in 1868
Taxonomy articles created by Polbot